Sarajevo Open may refer to:
 BH Telecom Indoors, a tennis tournament in Sarajevo
 Sarajevo Open (figure skating), a figure skating competition in Sarajevo
 Sarajevo Open (sitting volleyball), a sitting volleyball tournament competition in Sarajevo